Leonard "Len" Gandini (born 5 January 1962) is a former Australian rules football player for  in the Victorian Football League (VFL) and West Australian Football League (WAFL) clubs  and .

Playing career
After being recruited from Kelmscott, Gandini began his senior career with  before trying his luck in Victoria in 1986. In round 18 of the 1986 VFL season he made his VFL debut for Melbourne. Despite playing the final five matches of the season, he returned to Western Australia the following season.

References

External links

WAFL statistics

1962 births
Living people
Melbourne Football Club players
Swan Districts Football Club players
Perth Football Club players
Australian rules footballers from Western Australia